Tony White may refer to:
Tony White (American football), American football coach and former player
Tony White (basketball) (born 1965), American basketball player
Tony White (cricketer) (born 1938), West Indian cricketer
Tony White (ice hockey) (born 1954), retired Canadian hockey player
Tony White (writer), English novelist
Tony Joe White (1943–2018), an American singer-songwriter and guitarist
Tony L. White, CEO of Applera, Perkin-Elmer, and Baxter International
Tony White, drummer for Chrome Division

See also
Anthony White (disambiguation)